The Music Makers was a 1940s band from Saint Kitts and Nevis.  They were among the most popular of the Carnival bands from that era.

References

SKN Vibes

Saint Kitts and Nevis musicians